Kantapol Sompittayanurak is a Thai professional footballer who plays for Chiangmai United in the Thai League 2.

Honour
Nongbua Pitchaya
 Thai League 2 Champions : 2020–21

External links
 Goal.com
 Players Profile - info.thscore.com
 

1989 births
Living people
Kantapol Sompittayanurak
Kantapol Sompittayanurak
Association football defenders
Kantapol Sompittayanurak
Kantapol Sompittayanurak
Kantapol Sompittayanurak
Kantapol Sompittayanurak
Kantapol Sompittayanurak
Kantapol Sompittayanurak
Kantapol Sompittayanurak